is a Shinto shrine in Ōmachi, Nagano Prefecture, Japan. The shrine is the oldest extant example of shinmei-zukuri, one of three architectural styles which were conceived before the arrival of Buddhism in Japan. It predates in fact the more famous Ise Shrine, which shares the style and has been since antiquity rebuilt every twenty years. It was ranked as a Prefectural Shrine under the Modern system of ranked Shinto shrines.

This style is characterized by an extreme simplicity. Its basic features can be seen in Japanese architecture from the Kofun period (250–538 C.E.) onwards and it is considered the pinnacle of Japanese traditional architecture. It is most common in Mie prefecture. Built in planed, unfinished wood, the honden is either 3x2 ken or 1x1ken in size, has a raised floor, a gabled roof with an entry on one the non-gabled sides, no upward curve at the eaves, and purely decorative logs called chigi (vertical) and katsuogi (horizontal) protruding from the roof's ridge.

Notes

References

External links

Shinto shrines in Nagano Prefecture
National Treasures of Japan
Ōmachi, Nagano